Ruth Donnelly (May 17, 1896 – November 17, 1982) was an American film and stage actress.

Early years and family 
Born in Philadelphia, Pennsylvania, Donnelly was the daughter of Harry Augustus and Bessie B. Donnelly.

Her uncle, Frederick W. Donnelly, was the longtime mayor of Trenton, New Jersey.

According to a 1915 article in The Day Book, the young Donnelly was forced to leave Sacred Heart Convent in New Jersey because she repeatedly broke into laughter at inappropriate times.

Career 
Donnelly began her stage career at the age of 17 in The Quaker Girl.  Actress Rose Stahl took the teen under her wing and, after giving her training and a year's experience in the chorus, placed the then 18-year-old in the play Maggie Pepper. Her Broadway debut brought her to the attention of George M. Cohan, who proceeded to cast her in numerous comic-relief roles in such musicals as Going Up (1917).

Though she made her first film appearance in 1914, her Hollywood career began in earnest in 1931 and lasted until 1957. In her films she often played the wife of Guy Kibbee (Footlight Parade, Wonder Bar, Merry Wives of Reno, Mr. Smith Goes to Washington). Among her roles was the part of Sister Michael in The Bells of St. Mary's, starring Bing Crosby and Ingrid Bergman. Years after her final film role, she returned to the stage, understudying Patsy Kelly in the Broadway revival of No No Nanette with old co-star Ruby Keeler, and later appearing in the touring production starring Don Ameche and Evelyn Keyes.

Personal life and death
Donnelly was married to AC Spark Plug executive Basil Winter de Guichard, from 1932 until his death in 1958. 

She was a Democrat who supported Adlai Stevenson in the 1952 presidential election. Donnelly adhered to Roman Catholicism.

Donnelly died at Roosevelt Hospital in New York City at age 86.

Complete filmography

The Man Who Lost, But Won (1914 short) as Rose Mason, the Minister's Wife
The Skull (1914 short)
The Lady of the Island (1914 short) as The Nurse
When the Heart Calls (1914 short)
In All Things Moderation (1914 short) as Winnie Graham - the Youngest Daughter
The Tenth Commandment (1914 short) as The Doctor's Wife
Saved by a Song (1916 short) as Elsie
Rubber Heels (1927) as Fanny Pratt
Transatlantic (1931) as Burbank (scenes cut)
The Spider (1931) as Mrs. Wimbledon
Wicked (1931) as Fanny
The Cheat (1931) as Woman in Court Behind Elsa (uncredited)
The Rainbow Trail (1932) as Widow Abigail
Make Me a Star (1932) as The Countess
Jewel Robbery (1932) as Berta, Teri's Maid (uncredited)
Blessed Event (1932) as Miss Stevens
Employees' Entrance (1933) as Miss Hall
Hard to Handle (1933) as Lil Waters
Ladies They Talk About (1933) as Noonan
Lilly Turner (1933) as Edna Yokum
Private Detective 62 (1933) as Amy
Sing Sinner Sing (1933) as Margaret "Maggie" Flannigan
Goodbye Again (1933) as Richview Hotel Maid
Bureau of Missing Persons (1933) as Pete
Footlight Parade (1933) as Mrs. Harriet Gould
Ever in My Heart (1933) as Lizzie, the Housekeeper
Tis Spring (1933 short)
Female (1933) as Miss Frothingham
Havana Widows (1933) as Emily Jones
Convention City (1933) as Mrs. Ellerbe
Just Around the Corner (1933 short) as Mrs. Sears
Mandalay (1934) as Mrs. George Peters
Wonder Bar (1934) as Mrs. Simpson
Heat Lightning (1934) as Mrs. Ashton-Ashley
Merry Wives of Reno (1934) as Lois
Housewife (1934) as Dora
Romance in the Rain (1934) as Miss Sparks
Happiness Ahead (1934) as Anna
The White Cockatoo (1935) as Mrs. Byng
Maybe It's Love (1935) as Florrie Sands
Traveling Saleslady (1935) as Mrs. Twitchell
Alibi Ike (1935) as Bess
Red Salute (1935) as Mrs. Edith Rooney
Hands Across the Table (1935) as Laura
Personal Maid's Secret (1935) as Lizzie
Song and Dance Man (1936) as Patsy O'Madigan
Mr. Deeds Goes to Town (1936) as Mabel Dawson
Thirteen Hours by Air (1936) as Vi Johnson
Fatal Lady (1936) as Melba York
Cain and Mabel (1936) as Aunt Mimi
More Than a Secretary (1936) as Helen Davis
Roaring Timber (1937) as Aunt Mary
Portia on Trial (1937) as Jane Wilkins
A Slight Case of Murder (1938) as Nora Marco
Army Girl (1938) as Leila Kennett
Meet the Girls (1938) as Daisy Watson
Personal Secretary (1938) as Grumpy
The Affairs of Annabel (1938) as Josephine (Jo)
Annabel Takes a Tour (1938) as Josephine (Jo)
The Family Next Door (1939) as Mrs. Pierce
Mr. Smith Goes to Washington (1939) as Mrs. Hopper
The Amazing Mr. Williams (1939) as Effie Perkins
My Little Chickadee (1940) as Aunt Lou
Scatterbrain (1940) as Miss Stevens
Meet the Missus (1940) as Lil Higgins
Petticoat Politics (1941) as Lil Higgins
The Round Up (1941) as Polly Hope
Model Wife (1941) as Mrs. Milo Everett
The Gay Vagabond (1941) as Kate Dixon
Sailors on Leave (1941) as Aunt Navy
You Belong to Me (1941) as Emma
Rise and Shine (1941) as Mame Bacon
Johnny Doughboy (1942) as Biggy Biggsworth
This Is the Army (1943) as Mrs. O'Brien
Sleepy Lagoon (1943) as Sarah Rogers
Thank Your Lucky Stars (1943) as Nurse Hamilton
Pillow to Post (1945) as Mrs. Grace Wingate
The Bells of St. Mary's (1945) as Sister Michael
Cinderella Jones (1946) as Cora Elliot
In Old Sacramento (1946) as Zebby Booker
Cross My Heart (1946) as Eve Harper
The Ghost Goes Wild (1947) as Aunt Susan Beecher
Millie's Daughter (1947) as Helen Reilly
Little Miss Broadway (1947) as Aunt Minerva Van Dorn
The Fabulous Texan (1947) as Utopia Mills
Fighting Father Dunne (1948) as Kate Mulvey
The Snake Pit (1948) as Ruth
Down to the Sea in Ships (1949) as New Bedford Neighbor (scenes cut)
Where the Sidewalk Ends (1950) as Martha
I'd Climb the Highest Mountain (1951) as Glory White
The Secret of Convict Lake (1951) as Mary Fancher
The Wild Blue Yonder (1951) as Maj. Ida Winton
The Spoilers (1955) as Duchess
A Lawless Street (1955) as Molly Higgins
Autumn Leaves (1956) as Liz Eckhart
The Way to the Gold (1957) as Mrs. Williams

References

External links

1896 births
1982 deaths
20th-century American actresses
Actresses from New Jersey
American stage actresses
American film actresses
American television actresses
Actresses from Philadelphia
Actors from Trenton, New Jersey
New Jersey Democrats
Pennsylvania Democrats
California Democrats
New York (state) Democrats
American Roman Catholics